Strength to Love is a book by Martin Luther King Jr. It was published in 1963 as a collection of his sermons primarily on the topic of racial segregation in the United States and with a heavy emphasis on permanent religious values.

Major themes
King's writings reflect his deep understanding for the need of agape, a love that is concerned with going the extra mile to ensure the well-being of others. King believed in a better world, but in order to attain his vision we must first face our fears and then master these fears through courage, love, and faith. He preached of courage that all Christians should show in their nonviolent stand against segregation, although he did believe that all people could possess this strength of courage for we are all made in the image of God. This courage is the strength to hope for better days, the strength to have faith in the Lord, and most of all the strength to love all of God's children no matter their skin color.

Sources

References

External links

1963 non-fiction books
History of African-American civil rights
Works by Martin Luther King Jr.
American books
Harper & Row books
Books about religion
Books about race and ethnicity